Iskra is a rural locality (a settlement) in Shchetinsky Selsoviet Rural Settlement, Kursky District, Kursk Oblast, Russia. Population:

Geography 
The settlement is located on the Tuskar River (a right tributary of the Seym), 98 km from the Russia–Ukraine border, at the northern border of the district center – the town Kursk, 3.5 km from the selsoviet center – Shchetinka.

 Streets
There are the following streets in the locality: Dorozhnaya, Pervomayskaya and Shkolnaya (72 houses).

 Climate
Iskra has a warm-summer humid continental climate (Dfb in the Köppen climate classification).

Transport 

The rural locality is situated 9.5 km from Kursk Vostochny Airport, 131 km from Belgorod International Airport and 209 km from Voronezh Peter the Great Airport.

References

Notes

Sources

Rural localities in Kursky District, Kursk Oblast